Nuclear power construction costs have varied significantly across the world and in time. Large and rapid increases in cost occurred during the 1970s, especially in the United States. Recent cost trends in countries such as Japan and Korea have been very different, including periods of stability and decline in costs.

New nuclear power plants typically have high capital expenditure for building plants. Fuel, operational, and maintenance costs are relatively small components of the total cost. The long service life and high capacity factor of nuclear power plants allow sufficient funds for ultimate plant decommissioning and waste storage and management to be accumulated, with little impact on the price per unit of electricity generated. Additionally, measures to mitigate climate change such as a carbon tax or carbon emissions trading, favor the economics of nuclear power over fossil fuel power. Nuclear power is cost competitive with renewable generation when capital cost is in the region of 2000-3000 ($/KW).

Overview 

The economics of nuclear power are debated.
Some opponents of nuclear power cite cost as the main challenge for the technology.  Ian Lowe has also challenged the economics of nuclear power. 
Nuclear supporters point to the historical success of nuclear power across the world, and they call for new reactors in their own countries, including proposed new but largely uncommercialized designs, as a source of new power. Nuclear supporters point out that the Intergovernmental Panel on Climate Change (IPCC) endorses nuclear technology as a low carbon, mature energy source which should be nearly quadrupled to help address soaring greenhouse gas emissions.

Solar power has very low capacity factors compared to nuclear, and solar power can only achieve so much market penetration before (expensive) energy storage and transmission become necessary. This is because nuclear power "requires less maintenance and is designed to operate for longer stretches before refueling" while solar power is in a constant state of refueling and is limited by a lack of fuel that requires a backup power source that works on a larger scale.

In the United States, nuclear power faces competition from the low natural gas prices in North America. Former Exelon CEO John Rowe said in 2012 that new nuclear plants in the United States "don’t make any sense right now" and won't be economic as long as the natural gas surplus persists.

The price of new plants in China is lower than in the Western world.

In 2016, the Governor of New York, Andrew Cuomo, directed the New York Public Service Commission to consider ratepayer-financed subsidies similar to those for renewable sources to keep nuclear power stations (which accounted for one third of the state's generation, and half of its emissions-free generation) profitable in the competition against natural gas plants, which have replaced nuclear plants when they closed in other states.

A study in 2019 by the economic think tank DIW Berlin, found that nuclear power has not been profitable anywhere in the world. The study of the economics of nuclear power has found it has never been financially viable, that most plants have been built while heavily subsidised by governments, often motivated by military purposes, and that nuclear power is not a good approach to tackling climate change. It found, after reviewing trends in nuclear power plant construction since 1951, that the average 1,000MW nuclear power plant would incur an average economic loss of 4.8 billion euros ($7.7 billion AUD). This has been refuted by another study.

Investments 
Very large upfront costs and long project cycles make nuclear energy a very risky investment: fluctuations in the global economy, energy prices, or regulations can for example reduce the demand for energy, or make alternatives cheaper. However, in and of itself, nuclear projects are not inherently vastly riskier than other large infrastructure investments. After the 2009 recession, when the worldwide demand for electricity fell, and regulations became more permissive of unclean but cheap energy. In Eastern Europe, a number of long-established projects are struggling to find financing, notably Belene in Bulgaria and the additional reactors at Cernavoda in Romania, and some potential backers have pulled out. Where cheap gas is available and its future supply relatively secure, this also poses a major problem for clean energy projects.

Current bids for new nuclear power plants in China were estimated at between $2800/kW and $3500/kW, as China planned to accelerate its new build program after a pause following the Fukushima disaster. However, more recent reports indicated that China will fall short of its targets. While nuclear power in China has been cheaper than solar and wind power, these are getting cheaper while nuclear power costs are growing. Moreover, third generation plants are expected to be considerably more expensive than earlier plants. Therefore, comparison with other power generation methods is strongly dependent on assumptions about construction timescales and capital financing for nuclear plants. Analysis of the economics of nuclear power must take into account who bears the risks of future uncertainties. To date all operating nuclear power plants were developed by state-owned or regulated utility monopolies where many of the risks associated with political change and regulatory ratcheting were borne by consumers rather than suppliers. Many countries have now liberalized the electricity market where these risks, and the risk of cheap competition from subsidised energy sources emerging before capital costs are recovered, are borne by plant suppliers and operators rather than consumers, which leads to a significantly different evaluation of the risk of investing in new nuclear power plants. Generation III+ reactors are claimed to have a significantly longer design lifetime than their predecessors while using gradual improvements on existing designs that have been used for decades. This might offset higher construction costs to a degree, by giving a longer depreciation lifetime.

Construction costs 
"The usual rule of thumb for nuclear power is that about two thirds of the generation cost is accounted for by fixed costs, the main ones being the cost of paying interest on the loans and repaying the capital..."

Capital cost, the building and financing of nuclear power plants, represents a large percentage of the cost of nuclear electricity. In 2014, the US Energy Information Administration estimated that for new nuclear plants going online in 2019, capital costs will make up 74% of the levelized cost of electricity; higher than the capital percentages for fossil-fuel power plants (63% for coal, 22% for natural gas), and lower than the capital percentages for some other nonfossil-fuel sources (80% for wind, 88% for solar PV).

Areva, the French nuclear plant operator, offers that 70% of the cost of a kWh of nuclear electricity is accounted for by the fixed costs from the construction process.  Some analysts argue (for example Steve Thomas quoted in the book The Doomsday Machine by Martin Cohen and Andrew McKillop) that what is often not appreciated in debates about the economics of nuclear power is that the cost of equity, that is companies using their own money to pay for new plants, is generally higher than the cost of debt. Another advantage of borrowing may be that "once large loans have been arranged at low interest rates – perhaps with government support – the money can then be lent out at higher rates of return".

"One of the big problems with nuclear power is the enormous upfront cost. These reactors are extremely expensive to build. While the returns may be very great, they're also very slow. It can sometimes take decades to recoup initial costs. Since many investors have a short attention span, they don't like to wait that long for their investment to pay off."

Because of the large capital costs for the initial nuclear power plants built as part of a sustained build program and the relatively long construction period before revenue is returned, servicing the capital costs of first few nuclear power plants can be the most important factor determining the economic competitiveness of nuclear energy. The investment can contribute about 70% to 80% of the costs of electricity. Timothy Stone, businessman and nuclear expert, stated in 2017, "It has long been recognized that the only two numbers which matter in [new] nuclear power are the capital cost and the cost of capital." The discount rate chosen to cost a nuclear power plant's capital over its lifetime is arguably the most sensitive parameter to overall costs. Because of the long life of new nuclear power plants, most of the value of a new nuclear power plant is created for the benefit of future generations.

The recent liberalization of the electricity market in many countries has made the economics of nuclear power generation less enticing, and no new nuclear power plants have been built in a liberalized electricity market. Previously, a monopolistic provider could guarantee output requirements decades into the future. Private generating companies now have to accept shorter output contracts and the risks of future lower-cost competition, so they desire a shorter return on investment period.  This favours generation plant types with lower capital costs or high subsidies, even if associated fuel costs are higher. A further difficulty is that due to the large sunk costs but unpredictable future income from the liberalized electricity market, private capital is unlikely to be available on favourable terms, which is particularly significant for nuclear as it is capital-intensive. Industry consensus is that a 5% discount rate is appropriate for plants operating in a regulated utility environment where revenues are guaranteed by captive markets, and 10% discount rate is appropriate for a competitive deregulated or merchant plant environment. However, the independent MIT study (2003) which used a more sophisticated finance model distinguishing equity and debt capital had a higher 11.5% average discount rate.

A 2016 study argued that while costs did increase in the past for reactors built in the past, this does not necessarily mean there is an inherent trend of cost escalation with nuclear power, as prior studies tended to examine a relatively small share of reactors built and that a full analysis shows that cost trends for reactors varied substantially by country and era.

Another important factor in estimating a NPPs lifetime cost derives from its capacity factor. According to Anthonie Cilliers, a scholar and nuclear engineer, "Because of the large capital investment, and the low variable cost of operations, nuclear plants are most cost effective when they can run all the time to provide a return on the investment. Hence, plant operators now consistently achieve 92 percent capacity factor (average power produced of maximum capacity). The higher the capacity factor, the lower the cost per unit of electricity."

Delays and overruns 
Construction delays can add significantly to the cost of a plant. Since a power plant does not earn income during construction, and interest must be paid on debt from the time it is incurred, longer construction times translate directly into higher finance charges.

Modern nuclear power plants are planned for construction in five years or less (42 months for Canada Deuterium Uranium (CANDU) ACR-1000, 60 months from order to operation for an AP1000, 48 months from first concrete to operation for a European Pressurized Reactor (EPR) and 45 months for an ESBWR) as opposed to over a decade for some previous plants.

In Japan and France, construction costs and delays are significantly diminished because of streamlined government licensing and certification procedures. In France, one model of reactor was type-certified, using a safety engineering process similar to the process used to certify aircraft models for safety. That is, rather than licensing individual reactors, the regulatory agency certified a particular design and its construction process to produce safe reactors. U.S. law permits type-licensing of reactors, a process which is being used on the AP1000 and the ESBWR.

Canada has cost overruns for the Darlington Nuclear Generating Station, largely due to delays and policy changes, that are often cited by opponents of new reactors. Construction started in 1981 at an estimated cost of $7.4 Billion 1993-adjusted CAD, and finished in 1993 at a cost of $14.5 billion. 70% of the price increase was due to interest charges incurred due to delays imposed to postpone units 3 and 4, 46% inflation over a 4-year period and other changes in financial policy.

While in the United Kingdom and the United States cost overruns on nuclear plants contributed to the bankruptcies of  several utility companies. In the United States these losses helped usher in energy deregulation in the mid-1990s that saw rising electricity rates and power blackouts in California. When the UK began privatizing utilities, its nuclear reactors "were so unprofitable they could not be sold." Eventually in 1996, the government gave them away. But the company that took them over, British Energy, had to be bailed out in 2004 to the extent of 3.4 billion pounds.

Operational costs

Fuel 
Fuel costs account for about 28% of a nuclear plant's operating expenses.  As of 2013, half the cost of reactor fuel was taken up by enrichment and fabrication, so that the cost of the uranium concentrate raw material was 14 percent of operating costs. Doubling the price of uranium would add about 10% to the cost of electricity produced in existing nuclear plants, and about half that much to the cost of electricity in future power plants. The cost of raw uranium contributes about $0.0015/kWh to the cost of nuclear electricity, while in breeder reactors the uranium cost falls to $0.000015/kWh.

Nuclear plants require fissile fuel. Generally, the fuel used is uranium, although other materials may be used (See MOX fuel). In 2005, prices on the world market for uranium averaged US$20/lb (US$44.09/kg). On 2007-04-19, prices reached US$113/lb (US$249.12/kg). On 2008-07-02, the price had dropped to $59/lb.

As of 2008, mining activity was growing rapidly, especially from smaller companies, but putting a uranium deposit into production takes 10 years or more.  The world's present measured resources of uranium, economically recoverable at a price of US$130/kg according to the industry groups Organisation for Economic Co-operation and Development (OECD), Nuclear Energy Agency (NEA) and International Atomic Energy Agency (IAEA), are enough to last for "at least a century" at current consumption rates.

According to the World Nuclear Association, "the world's present measured resources of uranium (5.7 Mt) in the cost category less than three times present spot prices and used only in conventional reactors, are enough to last for about 90 years. This represents a higher level of assured resources than is normal for most minerals. Further exploration and higher prices will certainly, on the basis of present geological knowledge, yield further resources as present ones are used up." The amount of uranium present in all currently known conventional reserves alone (excluding the huge quantities of currently-uneconomical uranium present in "unconventional" reserves such as phosphate/phosphorite deposits, seawater, and other sources) is enough to last over 200 years at current consumption rates.

Waste disposal 

All nuclear plants produce radioactive waste. In order to pay for the cost of storing, transporting and disposing these wastes in a permanent location in the United States, a surcharge of a tenth of a cent per kilowatt-hour is added to electricity bills.  Roughly one percent of electrical utility bills in provinces using nuclear power are diverted to fund nuclear waste disposal in Canada.

The disposal of low level waste reportedly costs around £2,000/m³ in the UK. High level waste costs somewhere between £67,000/m³ and £201,000/m³. General division is 80%/20% of low level/high level waste, and one reactor produces roughly 12 m³ of high level waste annually.

Decommissioning 

At the end of a nuclear plant's lifetime, the plant must be decommissioned. This entails either dismantling, safe storage or entombment. In the United States, the Nuclear Regulatory Commission (NRC) requires plants to finish the process within 60 years of closing. Since it costs around $500 million or more to shut down and decommission a plant, the NRC requires plant owners to set aside money when the plant is still operating to pay for the future shutdown costs.

Decommissioning a reactor that has undergone a meltdown is inevitably more difficult and expensive. Three Mile Island was decommissioned 14 years after its incident for $837 million. The cost of the Fukushima disaster cleanup is not yet known, but has been estimated to cost around $100 billion.

Proliferation and terrorism 

A 2011 report for the Union of Concerned Scientists stated that "the costs of preventing nuclear proliferation and terrorism should be recognized as negative externalities of civilian nuclear power, thoroughly evaluated, and integrated into economic assessments—just as global warming emissions are increasingly identified as a cost in the economics of coal-fired electricity".

"Construction of the ELWR was completed in 2013 and is optimized for civilian electricity production, but it has "dual-use" potential and can be modified to produce material for nuclear weapons."

Safety 

Nancy Folbre, an economist at the University of Massachusetts, has questioned the economic viability of nuclear power following the 2011 Japanese nuclear accidents:
The proven dangers of nuclear power amplify the economic risks of expanding reliance on it. Indeed, the stronger regulation and improved safety features for nuclear reactors called for in the wake of the Japanese disaster will almost certainly require costly provisions that may price it out of the market.

The cascade of problems at Fukushima, from one reactor to another, and from reactors to fuel storage pools, will affect the design, layout and ultimately the cost of future nuclear plants.

Insurance 
Insurance available to the operators of nuclear power plants varies by nation. The worst case nuclear accident costs are so large that it would be difficult for the private insurance industry to carry the size of the risk, and the premium cost of full insurance would make nuclear energy uneconomic.

Nuclear power has largely worked under an insurance framework that limits or structures accident liabilities in accordance with the Paris convention on nuclear third-party liability, the Brussels supplementary convention, the Vienna convention on civil liability for nuclear damage, and in the United States the Price-Anderson Act. It is often argued that this potential shortfall in liability represents an external cost not included in the cost of nuclear electricity.

In Canada, the Canadian Nuclear Liability Act requires nuclear power plant operators to obtain $650 million (CAD) of liability insurance coverage per installation (regardless of the number of individual reactors present) starting in 2017 (up from the prior $75 million requirement established in 1976), increasing to $750 million in 2018, to $850 million in 2019, and finally to $1 billion in 2020. Claims beyond the insured amount would be assessed by a government appointed but independent tribunal, and paid by the federal government.

In the UK, the Nuclear Installations Act 1965 governs liability for nuclear damage for which a UK nuclear licensee is responsible. The limit for the operator is £140 million.

In the United States, the Price-Anderson Act has governed the insurance of the nuclear power industry since 1957. Owners of nuclear power plants are required to pay a premium each year for the maximum obtainable amount of private insurance ($450 million) for each licensed reactor unit. This primary or "first tier" insurance is supplemented by a second tier. In the event a nuclear accident incurs damages in excess of $450 million, each licensee would be assessed a prorated share of the excess up to $121,255,000. With 104 reactors currently licensed to operate, this secondary tier of funds contains about $12.61 billion. This results in a maximum combined primary+secondary coverage amount of up to $13.06 billion for a hypothetical single-reactor incident. If 15 percent of these funds are expended, prioritization of the remaining amount would be left to a federal district court. If the second tier is depleted, Congress is committed to determine whether additional disaster relief is required. In July 2005, Congress extended the Price-Anderson Act to newer facilities.

Cost per kWh 
The cost per unit of electricity produced (Kilowatt-hour, kWh, or Megawatt-hour, MWh = 1,000 kWh) will vary according to country, depending on costs in the area, the regulatory regime and consequent financial and other risks, and the availability and cost of finance. Construction costs per kilowatt of generating capacity will also depend on geographic factors such as availability of cooling water, earthquake likelihood, and availability of suitable power grid connections. So it is not possible to accurately estimate costs on a global basis.

Levelized cost of energy estimates 
In Levelized Cost of Energy (LCOE) estimates and comparisons, a very significant factor is the assumed discount rate which reflects the preference of an investor for short-term value of the funds as opposed to long-term value. As it's not a physical factor, but rather economic, a choice of specific values of discount rate can double or triple the estimated cost of energy merely based on that initial assumption. In case of low-carbon sources of energy, such as nuclear power, experts highlight that the discount rate should be set low (1-3%) as the value of low-carbon energy for future generations prevents very high future external costs of climate change. Numerous LCOE comparisons however use high discount rate values (10%) which mostly reflects preference for short-term profit by commercial investors without accounting for the decarbonization contribution. For example, IPCC AR3 WG3 calculation based on 10% discount rate produced LCOE estimate of $97/MWh for nuclear power, while by merely assuming 1.4% discount rate, the estimate drops to $42/MWh which is the same issue that has been raised for other low-carbon energy sources with high initial capital costs.

Other cross-market LCOE estimates are criticized for basing their calculation on undisclosed portfolio of cherry-picked projects that were significantly delayed due to various reasons, but not include projects that were built in time and within the budget. For example, Bloomberg New Energy Finance (BNEF), based on undisclosed portfolio of projects, estimated nuclear power LCOE at €190-375/MWh which is up to 900% higher than the published LCOE of €30/MWh for an actual existing Olkiluoto nuclear power plant, even after accounting for construction delays in OL3 block (although, this number is based on an average LCOE with new and old reactors). Based on the published methodology details, it has been pointed out that BNEF assumed cost of capital 230% higher than the actual one (1.56%), fixed operating costs at 300% higher than actual and nameplate power lower (1400 MW) than actual 1600 MW, all of which contributed to significant overestimate in price.

In 2019 the US EIA revised the levelized cost of electricity from new advanced nuclear power plants going online in 2023 to be $0.0775/kWh before government subsidies, using a regulated industry 4.3% cost of capital (WACC - pre-tax 6.6%) over a 30-year cost recovery period. Financial firm Lazard also updated its levelized cost of electricity report costing new nuclear at between $0.118/kWh and $0.192/kWh using a commercial 7.7% cost of capital (WACC - pre-tax 12% cost for the higher-risk 40% equity finance and 8% cost for the 60% loan finance) over a 40-year lifetime.

Comparisons with other power sources 

Generally, a nuclear power plant is significantly more expensive to build than an equivalent coal-fueled or gas-fueled plant. If natural gas is plentiful and cheap, the operating costs of conventional power plants is less. Most forms of electricity generation produce some form of negative externality costs imposed on third parties that are not directly paid by the producer such as pollution which negatively affects the health of those near and downwind of the power plant, and generation costs often do not reflect these external costs.

A comparison of the "real" cost of various energy sources is complicated by a number of uncertainties:
The increase and decrease of the cost change due to  climate change because emissions of greenhouse gases is hard to estimate.  Carbon taxes may be enacted, or carbon capture and storage may become mandatory.
The environmental damage cost increase that is caused by any energy source through land use (whether for mining fuels or for power generation), air and water pollution, solid waste production, manufacturing-related damages (such as from mining and processing ores or rare earth elements), etc.
The cost and political feasibility of disposal of the waste from reprocessed spent nuclear fuel is still not fully resolved.  In the United States, the ultimate disposal costs of spent nuclear fuel are assumed by the U.S. government after producers pay a fixed surcharge.
Due to the dominant role of initial construction costs and the multi-year construction time, the interest rate for the capital required (as well as the timeline that the plant is completed in) has a major impact on the total cost of building a new nuclear plant.

Lazard's report on the estimated levelized cost of energy by source (10th edition) estimated unsubsidized prices of $97–$136/MWh for nuclear, $50–$60/MWh for solar PV, $32–$62/MWh for onshore wind, and $82–$155/MWh for offshore wind.

However, the most important subsidies to the nuclear industry do not involve cash payments. Rather, they shift construction costs and operating risks from investors to taxpayers and ratepayers, burdening them with an array of risks including cost overruns, defaults to accidents, and nuclear waste management. This approach has remained remarkably consistent throughout the nuclear industry's history, and distorts market choices that would otherwise favor less risky energy investments.

Benjamin K. Sovacool said in 2011 that: "When the full nuclear fuel cycle is considered — not only reactors but also uranium mines and mills, enrichment facilities, spent fuel repositories, and decommissioning sites — nuclear power proves to be one of the costliest sources of energy".

Brookings Institution published The Net Benefits of Low and No-Carbon Electricity Technologies in 2014 which states, after performing an energy and emissions cost analysis, that "The net benefits of new nuclear, hydro, and natural gas combined cycle plants far outweigh the net benefits of new wind or solar plants", with the most cost effective low carbon power technology being determined to be nuclear power. Moreover, Paul Joskow of MIT maintains that the "Levelized cost of electricity" (LCOE) metric is a poor means of comparing electricity sources as it hides the extra costs, such as the need to frequently operate back up power stations, incurred due to the use of intermittent power sources such as wind energy, while the value of baseload power sources are underpresented.

Kristin Shrader-Frechette analysed 30 papers on the economics of nuclear power for possible conflicts of interest. She found of the 30, 18 had been funded either by the nuclear industry or pro-nuclear governments and were pro-nuclear, 11 were funded by universities or non-profit non-government organisations and were anti-nuclear, the remaining 1 had unknown sponsors and took the pro-nuclear stance. The pro-nuclear studies were accused of using cost-trimming methods such as ignoring government subsidies and using industry projections above empirical evidence where ever possible. The situation was compared to medical research where 98% of industry sponsored studies return positive results.

Other economic issues 

Nuclear power plants tend to be competitive in areas where other fuel resources are not readily available — France, most notably, has almost no native supplies of fossil fuels. France's nuclear power experience has also been one of paradoxically increasing rather than decreasing costs over time.

Making a massive investment of capital in a project with long-term recovery can affect a company's credit rating.

A Council on Foreign Relations report on nuclear energy argues that a rapid expansion of nuclear power may create shortages in building materials such as reactor-quality concrete and steel, skilled workers and engineers, and safety controls by skilled inspectors. This would drive up current prices.

Old nuclear plants generally had a somewhat limited ability to significantly vary their output in order to match changing demand (a practice called load following). However, many BWRs, some PWRs (mainly in France), and certain CANDU reactors (primarily those at Bruce Nuclear Generating Station) have various levels of load-following capabilities (sometimes substantial), which allow them to fill more than just baseline generation needs. Several newer reactor designs also offer some form of enhanced load-following capability.  For example, the Areva EPR can slew its electrical output power between 990 and 1,650 MW at 82.5 MW per minute.

The number of companies that manufacture certain parts for nuclear reactors is limited, particularly the large forgings used for reactor vessels and steam systems. In 2010, only four companies (Japan Steel Works, China First Heavy Industries, Russia's OMZ Izhora and Korea's Doosan Heavy Industries) manufacture pressure vessels for reactors of 1100 MWe or larger. It was suggested that this poses a bottleneck that could hamper expansion of nuclear power internationally, however, some Western reactor designs require no steel pressure vessel such as CANDU derived reactors which rely on individual pressurized fuel channels.  The large forgings for steam generators — although still very heavy — can be produced by a far larger number of suppliers.

For a country with both a nuclear power industry and a nuclear arms industry, synergies between the two can favor a nuclear power plant with an otherwise uncertain economy. For example, in the United Kingdom researchers have informed MPs that the government was using the Hinkley Point C project to cross-subsidise the UK military's nuclear-related activity by maintaining nuclear skills. In support of that, researchers from the University of Sussex Andy Stirling and Phil Johnstone stated that the costs of the Trident nuclear submarine programme would be prohibitive without “an effective subsidy from electricity consumers to military nuclear infrastructure”.

The hope for Economies of scale was one of the reasons of the development of "standard reactor designs" like the German "Konvoi" (only three such plants were ever actually built and they differ substantially from one another due to German federalism) or its successor, the French-German EPR (nuclear power plant).

Economists' opinions 
John Quiggin, an economist, maintains that the main problem with nuclear power is that it is not economically viable.

Recent trends 

The nuclear power industry in Western nations has a history of construction delays, cost overruns, plant cancellations, and nuclear safety issues despite significant government subsidies and support.

The 1.6 GWe EPR reactor is being built in Olkiluoto Nuclear Power Plant, Finland. A joint effort of French AREVA and German Siemens AG, it will be the largest pressurized water reactor (PWR) in the world. The Olkiluoto project has been claimed to have benefited from various forms of government support and subsidies, including liability limitations, preferential financing rates, and export credit agency subsidies, but the European Commission's investigation didn't find anything illegal in the proceedings. However, as of August 2009, the project is "more than three years behind schedule and at least 55% over budget, reaching a total cost estimate of €5 billion ($7 billion) or close to €3,100 ($4,400) per kilowatt". Finnish electricity consumers interest group ElFi OY evaluated in 2007 the effect of Olkiluoto-3 to be slightly over 6%, or €3/MWh, to the average market price of electricity within Nord Pool Spot. The delay is therefore costing the Nordic countries over 1.3 billion euros per year as the reactor would replace more expensive methods of production and lower the price of electricity.

Russia has launched the world's first floating nuclear power plant. The £100 million vessel, the Akademik Lomonosov, is the first of seven plants (70 MWe per ship) that Moscow says will bring vital energy resources to remote Russian regions. Startup of the first of the ships two reactors was announced in December 2018.

Following the Fukushima nuclear disaster in 2011, costs are likely to go up for currently operating and new nuclear power plants, due to increased requirements for on-site spent fuel management and elevated design basis threats. After Fukushima, the International Energy Agency halved its estimate of additional nuclear generating capacity built by 2035.

A 2017 analysis by Bloomberg showed that over half of U.S. nuclear plants were running at a loss, first of all those at a single unit site.

As of 2020, some companies and organizations have sought to develop proposals and projects aimed at reducing the traditional costs of nuclear power plant construction, often using small modular reactor designs rather than conventional reactors. For example, TerraPower, a company based in Bellevue, Washington and co-founded by Bill Gates, aims to build a sodium fast reactor for $1 billion with a proposed site in Kemmerer, Wyoming. Also in 2020, the Energy Impact Center, a Washington, D.C. based research institute founded by Bret Kugelmass, introduced the OPEN100 project, a platform that provides open-source blueprints for a nuclear plant with a pressurized water reactor. The OPEN100 model could be used to build a plant for $300 million in two years. Oklo, a Silicon Valley based startup, aims to build micro modular reactors that run off of radioactive waste produced by conventional nuclear power plants. Like OPEN100, Oklo aims to reduce costs partially by standardizing the construction of its plants. Other entities developing similar plans include, X-energy, NuScale Power, General Atomics, Elysium Industries, and others.

See also 
Cost of electricity by source
Generation IV reactor
Light Water Reactor Sustainability Program
List of books about nuclear issues
List of nuclear reactors
Lists of nuclear disasters and radioactive incidents
Nuclear decommissioning
Nuclear power debate
Renewable energy commercialization
World Nuclear Industry Status Report

References

External links 

 The Economics of Nuclear Power, World Nuclear Association, April 2010.
Nuclear Power's Global Expansion: Weighing Its Costs and Risks , 2010.

Nuclear power stations
Electricity economics